{{DISPLAYTITLE:C11H12N2O2}}
The molecular formula C11H12N2O2 (molar mass : 204.22 g/mol, exact mass : 204.089878) may refer to:

 Ethotoin
 Fenozolone
 Idazoxan
 Nirvanol
 ORG-26576
 3-Phenylazoacetylacetone
 Thozalinone
 Tryptophan